Aleksandar Stojković (Serbian Cyrillic: Александар Стојковић; born 15 August 1990 in Sombor) is a Serbian football midfielder, playing for FK Budućnost Dobanovci.

References

External links
 
 Aleksandar Stojković Stats at utakmica.rs

1990 births
Living people
Sportspeople from Sombor
Association football midfielders
Serbian footballers
FK Mladost Apatin players
FK Jagodina players
FK Radnički Sombor players
FK Hajduk Kula players
FK Voždovac players
FK Metalac Gornji Milanovac players
FK Kolubara players
FK Dinamo Vranje players
FK Budućnost Dobanovci players
Serbian First League players
Serbian SuperLiga players
Serbian expatriate footballers
Serbian expatriate sportspeople in Albania
Expatriate footballers in Albania
Besëlidhja Lezhë players
Kategoria Superiore players
Expatriate footballers in Greece
Serbian expatriate sportspeople in Greece